There are over 100 museums in Seoul.

National museums

Municipal museums

Private museums

See also
List of museums in South Korea
List of tallest buildings in Seoul
Architecture of South Korea

References
Korean museum association
 List of museums in South Korea
 Museums in Jongno-gu, Seoul
 List of museums in South Korea

 
Seoul
museums
Seoul